Field Songs is the fifth studio album by American country singer William Elliott Whitmore. It was released on July 12, 2011 by Anti-.

Critical reception
Field Songs was met with "universal acclaim" reviews from critics. At Metacritic, which assigns a weighted average rating out of 100 to reviews from mainstream publications, this release received an average score of 83 based on 11 reviews. Aggregate website AnyDecentMusic? gave the release a 7.5 out of 10 based on a critical consensus of 9 reviews.

In a review for AllMusic, critic reviewer Thom Jurek wrote: "By using numerous historical and societal references in these songs as signifiers, and small actions that resulted in large changes, Field Songs is 21st century folk music in the literal sense because it is linked to folk's tradition of social conscience across racial and class barriers>" At The A.V. Club, Jason Heller noted that Whitmore's voice is "an increasingly formidable piece of weaponry", going on to say "accompanied by the chirping of crickets or birds, each song reins in Whitmore's craggy, righteous howl, calming it with gentle strums and the weary plucking of acoustic guitar and banjo." Writing for Delusions of Adequacy, Jenn O'Donnell explained: "Field Songs is as simple and straightforward as a folk album could ever be. Simple banjo and guitar with the slightest amount of percussion, a voice, and something to say is all Whitmore needs to give his audience goose bumps or tears."

Track listing

Charts

References

External links
 
 
 Field Songs at Anti

2011 albums
William Elliott Whitmore albums
Anti- (record label) albums